Brothers on a Road Less Traveled is an American nonprofit organization supporting men who wish to reduce or eliminate their homosexual desires. Formerly known as People Can Change (PCC), the organization was founded in 2000.

Formation and purpose 
People Can Change was founded in 2000 by Rich Wyler based upon his experience with reparative therapy. The organization changed its name to Brothers on a Road Less Traveled ("Brothers Road" for short) in 2016.

In an interview with Warren Olney IV, Wyler explained that the organization's purpose is to help men find peace and fulfillment in their lives; while Wyler states that some men may find peace and fulfillment in a gay identity, he contends that other men with homosexual attractions have found fulfillment in celibacy or in heterosexual relationships. Many mental health organizations have criticized conversion therapy; however, Brothers Road "does not identify as an organisation for gay conversion therapy."

Programs 
The Journey Into Manhood (JiM) weekend is a program offered by Brothers on a Road Less Traveled; the JiM weekend was founded in 2002 by organization founder Rich Wyler and counselor David Matheson. The JiM weekend lasts for 48 hours and includes psychodrama, visualizations, role-playing, and team-building exercises. Journeyers "are taught that their same-sex attractions are rooted in childhood traumas that pulled them away from male figures" and that to experience sexual orientation change, they "need to fulfill their needs for male attention through non-sexual platonic bonding." "The founders do not promise [attendees] they will transition from being gay to straight [overnight], but the overall goal is to give the men a foundation so they can work on making the change over time." In 2017, Wyler stated that Journey into Manhood weekend participants must be 21 years of age and must attend the program voluntarily.

JiM weekends also include an activity that PCC has described as "safe healing touch" or "'father-son-style holding'". Dr. Jack Drescher of the American Psychiatric Association has stated that "there is no scientific evidence that 'healthy touch' exercises can help diminish same-sex attractions." Wyler has defended the practice as "'touch[ing] a core unmet need from childhood.'"

2016 Federal Trade Commission complaint 
In February 2016, Brothers Road (then PCC) was "reported to the Federal Trade Commission (FTC) and accused of breaking the prohibition on unfair and deceptive acts" by engaging in sexual orientation change efforts. The complaint stated that PCC "defraud[ed] consumers into believing that being gay is tantamount to a mental illness or defect", and added that various mental health organizations had debunked that belief. 
In a March 2016 statement, the World Psychiatric Association asserted that "'[there] is no sound scientific evidence that innate sexual orientation can be changed.'" PCC founder Rich Wyler "called the [FTC] complaint an 'act of hate and vicious bullying against our community of adult men – gay, bi-sexual, ex-gay and same-sex attracted men [that] choose to not identify as gay...'"

Exit of David Matheson

In January 2019, Journey Into Manhood co-founder David Matheson announced that he had embraced a gay identity.

See also 

Ex-gay movement
Homosexuals Anonymous
Joel 2:25 International
ManKind Project
Sexaholics Anonymous

References

External links

 Official website

Organizations in the ex-gay movement